The chassis configuration is a formula that gives information about the wheels of a road vehicle including number of wheels, number of driven wheels and number of steered wheels. A common example is 4x4.

Formula

The formula is defined as follows:

A × B / C

or

A × B * C

with:
 A = number of wheels (twin-mounted tires count as one wheel)
 B = number of driven wheels
 / = the fore of the rear axles is steered (pusher axle)
 * = the rearmost of the rear axles is steered (tag axle)
 C = number of steered wheels

Basis is always the standard configuration, meaning a steered front axle and a non-steered driven rear axle. This means: If only the front wheels are steered, the rearmost part of the formula can be left out. The most common example is probably the 4×4 configuration. 6×4*4 is the chassis configuration for a vehicle with six wheels where four wheels are driven, in addition, the two front wheels as well as the rearmost two wheels are steered. In this case it is a three-axled vehicle.

Often the formula A × B × C is used. Even if the information contained by C is needless, it means that only front axles are steered. This can give information about the distribution of axles. For example, provide manufacturers the chassis configuration 8×4×4 to show that the vehicle has two steered front axles and two driven rear axles, compared to the chassis configuration 8×4/4 where the vehicle has one steered front axle, one steered rear axle (the fore axle) and two driven rear axles (the aft axles).

See also
 :Category:All-wheel-drive vehicles
 6x6

References
 Josef Epker: Lastkraftwagen und Technik. Epjos Verlag, 2014.

External links 

Car layouts